"Steal This Episode" is the ninth episode of the twenty-fifth season of the American animated television series The Simpsons and the 539th episode of the series. It originally aired on the Fox network in the United States on January 5, 2014. The episode was written by J. Stewart Burns and directed by Matthew Nastuk. The title is a takeoff of Abbie Hoffman's Steal This Book (1971).

In the episode, to combat the poor quality of today's movie theaters, Homer and Bart team up to illegally download movies and exhibit them in a makeshift theater in the backyard, but Homer ends up arrested by the FBI when Marge sends Hollywood a check and an apology note.

Plot
Homer is getting frazzled over hearing spoilers about the current blockbuster films but his rushed trip to see a new one ends with him decrying the smartphone-laden atmosphere and being thrown out of the movie theater by ushers. Bart later cheers him up by showing him how to download the movie illegally. Homer then decides to open a backyard theater to show movies downloaded from the Internet. Marge starts to feel guilty after watching the movie and sends a check along with an apology letter to Hollywood to repay the money for the tickets she should have bought. A manager in Hollywood receives the letter and alerts the FBI after using the rolled-up check to snort cocaine.

The FBI raids the Simpsons' house and arrests Homer for movie piracy. Marge feels guilty for getting him in trouble; however, during dinner the next night, Marge defensively maintains the belief that she did the right thing, even though Bart and Lisa side with Homer (as Bart notes, being a movie pirate isn't even the worst kind of PIRATE Homer has ever been). Homer's bus to Springfield Penitentiary gets taken over by the prisoners who all consider copyright infringement to be much worse than robbing a bank or trafficking drugs and plan to kill him for his actions. The bus crashes and falls onto a ledge, where Homer is rescued by a passing train after the prisoners abandon the bus. He returns home and refuses to turn himself in after Marge asks him to give himself up.

Lisa takes the family to a Swedish consulate, since downloading movies is not illegal in Sweden. The FBI waits outside the consulate for Homer to leave, unsuccessfully trying to force him out by playing Judas Priest music at high volume. While in hiding, Marge confesses to Homer that she turned him in. Homer, feeling betrayed, sadly surrenders to the FBI and is taken into custody.

During his trial at a U.S. Federal Court, Homer makes no attempt to defend himself and is found guilty of illegal reproduction and distribution of copyrighted material. Before he is sentenced, and with some encouragement from Marge, he delivers a speech about his movie piracy. The Hollywood filmmakers who attend the trial are impressed by Homer's story and they drop all the charges, intending to buy the rights to Homer's story to turn it into a movie, with Homer asking to sign with whichever studio can convince Channing Tatum to gain the most weight to play him.

A week before the film, Streaming Valor, is released to movie theaters, the residents of Springfield give Homer a surprise special screening of an illegally downloaded copy. Homer gets angry at them, since he now gets money from the movie profit and kicks them out of his backyard while telling them to see it when it comes out in theaters.

While watching Streaming Valor in the theater, Bart asks Lisa which side were the real pirates: the movie producers or those fighting for Internet freedom. Lisa says that both sides claim their intentions are noble, but they are just trying to make as much money as possible. She then proceeds to say who the "real pirate" is, but is censored by NASCAR footage (footage from the 2011 Goody's Fast Relief 500, which was broadcast by Fox), which was also used to censor parts of Bart teaching Homer how to download movies, during the credits followed by a pirate flag and the laughing sounds of Seth Rogen.

Reception
The episode received generally positive reviews from critics.

Dennis Perkins of The A.V. Club gave the episode a B, saying "The strongest episode of The Simpsons’ 25th season so far, 'Steal This Episode' avoids a few pitfalls the show has been more prone to stumble into in later years, provides a double-handful of funny lines and gags, and actually seems invested in telling a coherent story from beginning to end. Not classic Simpsons by any yardstick, but certainly a welcome respite from what has been a streak of fairly dire late-run episodes."

Teresa Lopez of TV Fanatic applauded the episode and gave it a 5 out of 5, commenting mainly on the show's use of guest stars, saying "the stars were an essential part of the plot, so it made sense to trot out Judd Apatow and his usual crew of actors (Seth Rogen, Paul Rudd, Leslie Mann), along with Channing Tatum as well. In essence, the episode really played to the show's strengths. For example, Homer is always behind the times and, once he's caught up, he can't help but take his new hobbies too far."

The episode received a 4.6 rating and was watched by a total of 12.04 million people, making it the most watched show on Animation Domination that night.

This marks the most-watched episode of the series since the twenty-second season episode "Moms I'd Like to Forget."

J. Stewart Burns was nominated for a Writers Guild of America Award for Outstanding Writing in Animation at the 67th Writers Guild of America Awards for his script to this episode.

References

External links 
 
 "Steal This Episode" at theSimpsons.com

2014 American television episodes
The Simpsons (season 25) episodes
Television episodes about theft